The men's 4 × 100 metre medley relay competition of the swimming events at the 1971 Pan American Games took place on 11 August. The defending Pan American Games champion is the United States.

Results
All times are in minutes and seconds.

Heats

Final 
The final was held on August 11.

References

Swimming at the 1971 Pan American Games